is a 1995 Japan-exclusive Captain Tsubasa video game developed and published by Bandai and was the final Captain Tsubasa game for the Super Famicom.

References

External links
 Game Reviews at GameFAQs
 Captain Tsubasa J at superfamicom.org

1995 video games
Bandai games
The Way to World Youth
Japan-exclusive video games
Super Nintendo Entertainment System games
Super Nintendo Entertainment System-only games
Video games developed in Japan
Video games set in Japan
Multiplayer and single-player video games